An evaporative light scattering detector (ELSD) is a detector used in conjunction with high-performance liquid chromatography (HPLC), Ultra high-performance liquid chromatography (UHPLC), Purification liquid chromatography such as flash or preparative chromatography, countercurrent or centrifugal partition chromatographies and Supercritical Fluid chromatography (SFC). It is commonly used for analysis of compounds where UV detection might be a restriction and therefore used where compounds do not efficiently absorb UV radiation, such as sugars, antivirals, antibiotics, fatty acids, lipids, oils, phospholipids, polymers, surfactants, terpenoids and triglycerides. ELSDs is related to the charged aerosol detector (CAD) and like the CAD, falls under the category of destructive detectors.

An evaporative light scattering detector (ELSD) is able to detect all compound which are less volatile than the mobile phase, i.e. non volatile and semi-volatile compounds.

Principles of operation

ELSDs analyze solvent after elution from HPLC. As the eluent passes from an HPLC, it is mixed with an inert carrier gas and forced through a nebulizer, which separates the liquid into minute aerosolized droplets. These droplets then pass into a heated drift tube, where the mobile phase solvent is evaporated off. As the mobile phase evaporates, the droplets become smaller and smaller until all that is left is minute particles of dried analyte. These particles are pushed through the drift tube by the carrier gas to the detection region. In this region, a beam of light crosses the column of analyte and the scattering of light is measured by a photodiode or photomultiplier tube. The detector's output is non-linear across more than one order of magnitude and proper calibration is required for quantitative analysis.

References

Measuring instruments